Toni Ann Gisondi is a former child actress, best known for playing Molly—the youngest orphan—in the 1982 film version of the musical Annie.

Acting career

Toni Ann was six when she was picked for the role of Molly in the 1982 film version of the musical Annie, which starred Aileen Quinn in the title role. She was nominated for "Best Young Supporting Actress in a Motion Picture" in the 1981-1982 Young Artist Awards, and merits a mention in the 2002 edition of the St. James Encyclopedia of Pop Culture, for her "sweet" performance.

She also performed on the best-selling soundtrack album to the movie of Annie and went on to act in a made-for-TV movie, The Children's Story, also in 1982, in which she played a student.

Personal life
Toni Ann Gisondi is married to Theodore Pugliese and the couple have two daughters, Molly Marie and Melody Rose. Molly, who was born on November 1, 2000, shares her name with the orphan Toni Ann played in Annie.``

References

External links
 
 Annieorphans.com:
 Jon Merrill's Annie movie trivia:
 The 2008 Barnes and Noble "Life After Tomorrow Reunion," which Gisondi attended. 

1975 births
American child actresses
American film actresses
American television actresses
Living people
People from Egg Harbor Township, New Jersey
Actresses from New Jersey
21st-century American women